The Ministry of Privatization and Economic Reconstruction of the Republic of Serbia was the ministry in the Government of Serbia which was in charge of the privatization and economic reconstruction. The ministry was abolished on 3 March 2004.

History
The Ministry was established on 11 February 1991. Over the years, it has changed its name several times. It was abolished on 3 March 2004, and the Ministry of Economy took over its jurisdictions.

List of ministers

See also
 Ministry of Economy

Defunct government ministries of Serbia
1991 establishments in Serbia
Ministries established in 1991
2004 disestablishments in Serbia
Ministries disestablished in 2004